Dyschirius heydeni is a species of ground beetle in the subfamily Scaritinae. It was described by A. Fleischer in 1899.

References

heydeni
Beetles described in 1899